The Port Melbourne Football Club, nicknamed The Borough, is an Australian rules football club based in the inner-Melbourne suburb of Port Melbourne. The club was founded in 1874 and has been competing in the Victorian Football Association/League (VFL) since 1886.

Port Melbourne is the most successful club in the VFL, having won 17 senior men's premierships, three more than its nearest rival, Williamstown. The club has maintained stand-alone status, without being in a formal reserves affiliation with a club from the Australian Football League (AFL), for all but five years of its history.

Consequently Port Melbourne is considered one of the strongest Victorian-based football clubs that does not compete in the AFL. The club has fielded a women's team in the VFL Women's (VFLW) competition since 2021, and in the past it has fielded premiership-winning teams in the now-defunct VFL Reserves and Development leagues.

History

The Port Melbourne Football Club joined the senior ranks Victorian Football Association (VFA) in 1886, its inaugural team formed in large part from members of the powerful nearby South Melbourne Football Club which had dominated metropolitan football in 1885. The club has played in every VFA/VFL season since that time. In 1897, Port Melbourne was left out of the group of eight clubs which formed the breakaway VFL competition, despite having regularly been about the sixth- or seventh- best performing team onfield. Historian Terry Keenan theorised that the likeliest reason for Port Melbourne's exclusion was the reputation for the poor behaviour that its players and spectators had developed over the previous decade; its rivalry with and proximity to South Melbourne and the fact that Port Melbourne had supported the gate equalisation measures which the breakaway clubs were trying to escape were also speculated to have contributed to the decision.

The club, and the suburb of Port Melbourne in general, were heavily associated with wharf labourers and the union movement. During a 1928 waterfront strike in Melbourne, a wharf labourer protesting the use of scab labour was shot by police; as a result, the club banned any police from playing with them. The policy remained in place until the late 1950s.

Port Melbourne went on to become one of the strongest clubs in the VFA, and today still attracts some of the biggest crowds to its games. The club had very strong links with the Port Melbourne community, arguably the strongest community relationship within the VFA; local juniors often held stronger aspirations to play for Port Melbourne than for the VFL's South Melbourne – which by the 1950s was perennially struggling and to which the Port Melbourne area was zoned – and even players as highly decorated as Brownlow Medallists Peter Bedford and Bob Skilton returned to play with Port Melbourne after their VFL careers. Over the twenty-eight seasons from 1961 until 1988 that the VFA was partitioned into two divisions, Port Melbourne played every season in the first division – a distinction shared only with the Sandringham.

Traditionally, Port Melbourne's greatest rivals are the Williamstown Seagulls and the Sandringham Zebras. All three teams continue to play in the VFL to this day.

Since the AFL reserves competition merged with the Victorian Football League in 2000, Port Melbourne has been involved in two affiliations: with the Sydney Swans (2001–2002), and with the Kangaroos (2003–2005); since 2006, Port Melbourne has existed as a stand-alone VFL club. The club has fielded a team in the VFL Women's competition since 2021.

In under-age football, Port Melbourne has been affiliated with the Oakleigh Chargers NAB League team since the 1999 season, and the Chargers adopted Port Melbourne's colours as part of the affiliation. Port Melbourne had previously been affiliated with the Geelong Falcons (1996–1998), and in 1995 was part of a three-way affiliation which saw it share the Calder Cannons and Western Jets with Williamstown and Coburg.

The club's onfield nickname is the Borough or Boroughs, one of the more unusual nicknames in the sport, coming from the club's location in what was once the Borough of Port Melbourne. The name stuck, even after the area was upgraded to the status of town in 1893, and eventually city in 1919.

Club Jumper
The Port Melbourne Football Club's Guernsey is royal blue with red vertical stripes.

Uniform evolution

Club song
The club song is sung to the tune of "You're a Grand Old Flag".

2011 season
In 2011, Port Melbourne completed a perfect season, winning all eighteen home-and-away games, then three finals matches, culminating in a 56-point win against Williamstown in the Grand Final. It was the first perfect season in the VFA/VFL first division since 1918.

Team of the Century
The Port Melbourne Team of the Century was selected in August 2003:

Honours

Grand Final performances
1897 – runners-up North Melbourne
1901 – runners-up Richmond
1922 – Port Melbourne 9.6 (60) d Footscray 8.10 (58) (Crowd: 22,000)
1940 – Port Melbourne 23.22 (160) d Prahran 17.11 (113) (Crowd: 30,882)
1941 – Port Melbourne 15.18 (108) d Coburg 11.23 (89) (Crowd: 36,289)
1947 – Port Melbourne 15.13 (103) d Sandringham 11.8 (74) (Crowd: 24,000)
1953 – Port Melbourne 21.15 (141) d Yarraville 12.9 (81) (Crowd: 40,000)
1964 – Port Melbourne 14.17 (101) d Williamstown 10.5 (65) (Crowd: 20,000)
1966 – Port Melbourne 13.12 (90) d Waverley 6.11 (47) (Crowd: 20,000)
1974 – Port Melbourne 22.20 (152) d Oakleigh 11.17 (83) (Crowd: 23,936)
1976 – Port Melbourne 19.18 (132) d Dandenong 10.15 (75) (Crowd: 32,317)
1977 – Port Melbourne 23.19 (157) d Sandringham 7.15 (57) (Crowd: 29,664)
1980 – Port Melbourne 11.15 (81) d Coburg 10.10 (70) (Crowd: 22,010)
1981 – Port Melbourne 32.19 (211) d Preston 15.8 (98) (Crowd: 20,186)
1982 – Port Melbourne 21.15 (141) d Preston 20.14 (134) (Crowd: 20,732)
2011 – Port Melbourne 22.12 (144) d Williamstown 13.10 (88) (Crowd: 11,896)
2017 – Port Melbourne 11.8 (74) d Richmond 10.10 (70) (Crowd: 17,159)
Total Premierships – 17
Total Grand Finals – 33

Post War Placings

Records

League History: VFA/VFL 1886-15, 1918–41, 1945–present
Record Attendance: 36,289 v the Coburg Lions in 1941
Most Games: 253 by Fred Cook
Most Goals: 1210 by Fred Cook
Liston Medallists: E. Hyde (1930), W. Findlay (1946), F. Johnson (1952), V. Aanensen (1979, 1981), S. Allender (1980), W. Swan (1982, 1983), S. Harkins (1990), S. Valenti (2010, 2011)
Highest Score: 43.29 (287) v Sandringham in 1941
Lowest Score: 0.2 (2) v Prahran in 1902
Longest Winning Run: 28 (2011–2012)
Longest Losing Run: 14 (1909)

Coaches

 Percy Wilson (1927–1929)
 Charlie Stanbridge (1930–31)
 Percy Wilson (1932)
 B Lovett (1933)
 Gus Dobrigh (1934)
 Tommy Lahiff, Ron Shapter (1935)
 B Rudd (1936)
 Jack Bissett (1937)
 H Crompton (1937)
 Tommy Lahiff (1937–38)
 Frank Kelly (1940–41)
 Tommy Lahiff (1941, 1945–46)
 Bill Findlay (1947–48)
 Jim Cleary (1949–1952)
 Don Fraser (1953–55)
 Frank Johnson (1956–57)
 T Brooker (1958–59)
 Don Furness (1960–61)
 Tommy Lahiff (1962)
 Laurie Mithen (1963–65)
 Brian Buckley (1966–68)
 Bob Bonnett (1969–71)
 Ian Collins (1972–73)
 Norm Brown (1974–78)
 Peter McKenna (1979)
 Gary Brice (1980–1983)
 Warwick Irwin (1984)
 Gary Brice (1985)
 Peter Chisnall (1986)
 G Allen (1987–88)
 Brett Yorgey (1989–90)
 Doug Searl (1991–92)
 Damian Drum (1993)
 David Cloke (1994)
 Shane Molloy (1995)
 N Ross (1996–1998)
 Darren Crocker (1999)
 David Dunbar (2000–2003)
 Gerard FitzGerald (2004)
 S Ghazi (2005–2007)
 Gary Ayres (2008–2021)
  Adam Skrobalak (2022–present)

VFLW squad
1. Olivia Barton 
2. Kate Dudley
3. Lucy de Gloria Cade
4. Courtney Bromage
5. Hannah Fosbrooke 
6. Lisa Davie
8. Maddy Baldwin
9. Melissa Kuys (cc)
10. Sophie Locke
11. Maddi Shaw
12. Nayely Borg
14. Lucy Grocock
15. Claire Dyett (cc)
16. Beth Wilson
17. Bridie Winbanks
18. Kaitlyn O'Keefe
19. Caley Ryan
21. Tara Jasper
22. Akayla Peterson
23. Zoe McWhinney 
24. Jess Joyce
27. Emily Harley
29. Bella Stutt
30. Mia Breidis
32. Kate Adams
33. Chloe Locke
35. Sabine Navarro 
44. Lauren Atkinson
48. Stella Reid
52. Ingrid Houtsma
59. Sarah Dargan

See also
 1967 VFA Grand Final

References

Sources

 Atkinson, G. (1982) Everything you ever wanted to know about Australian rules football but couldn't be bothered asking, The Five Mile Press: Melbourne. .
Terry Keenan. 2006. Unduly Rough Play – A History of the Port Melbourne Football Club, Volume 2 1918 – 1944. Albert Park: Eucalyptus Press
Terry Keenan. 2004. Kicking into the Wind – A History of the Formative Years of the Port Melbourne Football Club 1874–1917. Petersham: Walla Walla Press
Terry Keenan. 1999. A Taste of Port. Albert Park: Eucalyptus Press
Terry Keenan. A Family Feud. Port Melbourne: Port Melbourne Historical and Preservation Society.
Terry Keenan. Keeping Out the Riff-Raff. Port Melbourne: Port Melbourne Historical and Preservation Society.
Marc Fiddian. The VFA – A History of the Victorian Football Association 1877–1995.

External links

 
 Full Points Footy Profile for Port Melbourne
 Port Melbourne Historical and Preservation Society

Victorian Football League clubs
Australian rules football clubs in Melbourne
1874 establishments in Australia
Australian rules football clubs established in 1874
Sport in the City of Port Phillip